Calvin Tilden Hulburd (June 5, 1809 – October 25, 1897) was a United States representative from New York during the American Civil War and Reconstruction.

Early life
Born in Stockholm, New York, he completed preparatory studies and graduated from Middlebury College in Vermont.  Hulburd studied law with Abraham Van Vechten, attended Yale Law School, was admitted to the bar in 1833, and started a practice in Brasher Falls, New York, an unincorporated village in the town of Brasher.

Start of career
Rather than concentrate solely on the law, Hulburd focused primarily on agriculture and business.  In partnership with his brother he owned and operated a large farm, gristmill and dry goods store.  He also served as the Postmaster in Brasher Falls.

An Antislavery Barnburner and then Free Soil Democrat, Hulburd was a member of the New York State Assembly in 1842, 1843, and 1844.

He became a Republican when the party was organized in the mid-1850s.  From 1860 to 1861 he served as Brasher's Town Supervisor, which also made him a member of the St. Lawrence County Board of Supervisors.  He served again in the State Assembly in 1862.

Later career
Hulburd was elected to the 38th, 39th and 40th Congresses, holding office from March 4, 1863 to March 3, 1869; while in the House he was chairman of the Committee on Public Expenditures, the predecessor of the current Committee on Oversight and Government Reform.

From 1869 to 1880, Hulburd was superintendent of construction for the New York City Post Office and Courthouse.  From 1870 to 1873, he served again as Brasher's Town Supervisor.

Death and burial
Hulburd died in Brasher Falls on October 25, 1897.  Interment was in Fairview Cemetery.

Honors
In 1867, Hulburd received an honorary Doctor of Laws (LL.D.) from Hamilton College.

Other
His name sometimes appears in contemporary records and media accounts as "Hurlburd."

References

External links
 Retrieved on 2009-03-17

1809 births
1897 deaths
People from Stockholm, New York
Yale Law School alumni
Members of the New York State Assembly
Town supervisors in New York (state)
County legislators in New York (state)
Union (American Civil War) political leaders
Middlebury College alumni
Hamilton College (New York) alumni
New York (state) Democrats
People of New York (state) in the American Civil War
Burials in New York (state)
Republican Party members of the United States House of Representatives from New York (state)
New York (state) Free Soilers
New York (state) postmasters
19th-century American politicians